René Le Bègue (15 January 1914 – 24 February 1946) was a Parisian-born  French race car driver in Rally and Grand Prix motor racing. In his first year of top level racing, his best showing came at the 1936 Spa 24 Hours endurance race when he drove a Delahaye to a 2nd-place finish. In 1937 he and his co-pilot Julio Quinlin won the Monte Carlo Rally driving a Delahaye. That year Le Bègue also won  the Coupe de Vitesse at the Autodrome de Montlhéry driving a Talbot-Lago T150 and had several top-three finishes. He then teamed up with André Morel to claim victory in the 1938 12 hours of Paris endurance race for sports cars. In 1939 he finished 3rd in the French Grand Prix behind the dominant Auto Union Silver Arrows then went on to win the Grand Prix du Comminges.

The following year, Le Bègue traveled to the United States to compete in the 1940 Indianapolis 500 alongside fellow Frenchman René Dreyfus. Driving a pair of Maseratis for the American/French owner Lucy O'Reilly Schell, Le Bègue qualified 31st, but Dreyfus was bumped and ended up as the second alternate. On race day, it was decided for the two drivers to split time in the car, and each drove two stints of approximately 50 laps (125 miles) apiece. Le Bègue started the race and ran approximately laps 1–50 and laps 101–150. Dreyfus piloted the car for laps 51–100 and from 151 to the finish. The pair brought the car home in 10th place, flagged 8 laps down. A rainstorm prompted officials to flag the race after only the first three finishers received the checkered flag.

René Le Bègue continued racing until the German occupation of France during World War II when he joined the Free French Forces. With the war over, in 1946 he prepared to return to the racing scene and was elected vice-president of the French Drivers Association (AGACI, Association Générale des Amicales et Coureurs Indépendants). However, early that year before the season started the thirty-two-year-old Le Bègue was accidentally asphyxiated by gas leaking from a defective water heater in his bathroom. The 9 June 1946 Grand Prix race at Saint-Cloud, won by Raymond Sommer, was named the René Le Bègue Cup in his memory.

Indianapolis 500 results

References

 DV3 Limited website
 The Golden Era of Grand Prix Racing 

French racing drivers
Grand Prix drivers
French rally drivers
Indianapolis 500 drivers
Free French military personnel of World War II
Racing drivers from Paris
1914 births
1946 deaths
Accidental deaths in France
Deaths from asphyxiation
24 Hours of Le Mans drivers
European Championship drivers